The  Oregon lunar sample displays  are two commemorative plaques consisting of small fragments of Moon specimen brought back with the Apollo 11 and Apollo 17 lunar missions and given in the 1970s to the people of Oregon by United States President Richard Nixon as goodwill gifts.

Description

Apollo 11

Apollo 17

History 

The Oregon Apollo 11 lunar sample display is exhibited in the governor's ceremonial office at the Oregon State Capitol.

According to Moon rocks researcher Robert Pearlman, the Oregon Apollo 17 "goodwill Moon rock" plaque display is at the Earth Science Hall of the Oregon Museum of Science and Industry in Portland.

See also
 List of Apollo lunar sample displays

References

Further reading 
 
 Lynn, Capi (14 February 2010). "A Few Specks From Moon Spark Search Across Earth". Statesman Journal, p. C.1. 

Tourist attractions in Oregon
Stolen and missing moon rocks